I Am Anne Frank may refer to:
I Am Anne Frank (musical), a 1996 American musical
I Am Anne Frank (American Horror Story), a two-part episode of the FX anthology television series American Horror Story, aired November 2012